Ranade is a family name, common among the Chitpavan Brahmin community in Western Maharashtra, India.

Ranade family originated from Bhatgaon, Guhagar Ratnagiri.[2]

Each year Ranade family celebrates Mahashivratri utsav at Asud , Vyaghreshwar Near Dapoli, Ratnagiri [3].

Notable people
Notable people with the surname include:

Mahadev Govind Ranade (1842–1901) – Indian scholar, social reformer and author
Ramabai Ranade (1862–1924) – Indian women's rights activist, Mahadev Ranade's wife
Ramachandra Dattatrya Ranade (1886–1957) – scholar of Indian philosophy
Eknath Ranade (1914–1982) – Indian activist
Mohan Ranade (born 1929) – Indian freedom fighter
Sadashiv Ranade (1912–?) – Indian biographer, historian and genealogist
Savkaar Krishnaji Ranade (1860-1935) - a prominent banker(savkaar) hailing from Wai. The family controlled many acres of land around the prominent town of brahmins

References

External links
Ranade Family Website
Indian surnames
Marathi-language surnames